Doxey is a village and civil parish in the borough of Stafford in Staffordshire, England.  It is a north-western suburb of Stafford.  The village became a civil parish on 1 April 2005.

There is some uncertainty about the origin of the name Doxey but it seems that it was originally Dokesei (This may be "Ducks Island" - a reference to the fact that the centre of Doxey would have been surrounded by marsh). In the Domesday Book it is spelt Dochesig.

Transport links
Buses

Doxey is served by the Number 6 Arriva Midlands bus service between Doxey and Stafford town centre. It runs about every 30 minutes.
 
Current timetables (click to view)
Arriva Routes & Timetables
Route 12 - Doxey - Stafford Town Centre

Trains

Stafford station (1.5miles 2.2 km) is on the West Coast Main Line and provides frequent services to London Euston, Birmingham New Street, Manchester Piccadilly, Penkridge, Liverpool Lime Street etc.

Road

The road through Doxey generally follows the old road out to Seighford and Derrington. Doxey is the site of a motorway maintenance area for the M6 and is used as an access point for the emergency services.

Schools
Doxey Primary & Nursery School School - Ofsted Report
Doxey Playgroup    https://web.archive.org/web/20080905124215/http://www.doxeyplaygroup.bravehost.com/ Ofsted reports https://web.archive.org/web/20081203111232/http://www.doxeyplaygroup.bravehost.com/assessments.html
King Edward VI High School - Highfields
Blessed William Howard Catholic School
Stafford Grammar School (Private)

Churches
St Thomas and St Andrew Church of England - a distinctive building built in 1975, replacing the now demolished St Thomas in Derby St. and the small St Andrew church (near Doxey Stores opposite The Drive)
The New Testament Church of God

Geography
The new parish is bound by the West Coast Main Line, River Sow and Doxey Marshes to the north, the M6 motorway to the west and to the south an area of low-lying agricultural land leading to Stafford Castle and the Way for the Millennium (Staffordshire) footpath (previously the Stafford-Newport-Shrewsbury railway line, now established as the 'Greenway').

Tourist attractions & leisure
Doxey has easy access to a number of walking and cycling routes, of particular interest is the Way for the Millennium (Staffordshire) footpath. This is an easy walk for all, treating you to some great countryside views and regular stops at other local villages and towns. There is plenty to explore off the path as well and as it runs all the way to Burton upon Trent, should keep even the hardiest of walkers entertained for some time.

Additional walks
Doxey to Stafford Castle Doorstep Walk
Doxey Marshes and Tillington Doorstep Walk

There is a  wet grassland site, located in the heart of the County town of Stafford known as Doxey Marshes which connects to additional walking and cycle paths. It is managed by Staffordshire Wildlife Trust.

Notable people 
Stanley Gobey (1916 in Doxey – 1992) an English first-class cricketer who played for Warwickshire in 1946

See also
Listed buildings in Doxey

References

External links

Doxey Community Association
A History of the Doxey Community Association 1995-2006
Doxey Marshes - Staffordshire Wildlife Trust
Way for the Millennium - The Ramblers Association

Villages in Staffordshire
Borough of Stafford